The Galleria nazionale di Parma is an art gallery in Parma, northern Italy.

Painters exhibited in the museum include Beato Angelico, Fra Angelico, Canaletto, Ludovico Carracci (The Funeral of the Virgin Mary), Agostino Carracci (Madonna and Child with Saints), Correggio, Leonardo da Vinci, Sebastiano del Piombo, Guercino (Susannah and the Elders), Parmigianino (Mystic Marriage of Saint Catherine), Tintoretto, and others.

History 
The Parmesan collections were established in Renaissance times by the Farnese family, with Pope Paul III and cardinal Alessandro Farnese. 

In 1734, Charles III of Spain had most of the works moved to Naples. Some were kept thanks to the intervention of Philip, Duke of Parma. 

Later, the remaining collection was increased with the addition of Greco-Roman findings, donations, and with the restitution of some of the works that had been taken to Naples, as well as, through new acquisitions under Duke Ferdinand (1758).

During the French occupation of Parma (1803–1814), the works were moved to Paris, returning in 1816. Duchess Marie Louise reordered the collections in the Palazzo della Pilotta and built the hall that now bears her name. She also acquired several noble collections in the duchy to avoid their dispersal.

Gallery

See also
 List of national galleries

External links 
Official website 

 
Museums in Parma
Art museums established in 1760
Art museums and galleries in Emilia-Romagna
1760 establishments in Italy
Parma